Merve Tanıl (born February 22, 1990 in Ankara) is a Turkish volleyball player. She is 180 cm and plays as setter. She played for |İBA Kimya TED Ankara Kolejliler before she was transferred by Yeşilyurtspor for the 2013-14 season. She also played for Vakıfbank Güneş Sigorta, Fenerbahçe Acıbadem and Ereğli Belediye in the past. She studied at Bahçeşehir University in Istanbul.

With Fenerbahçe Acıbadem, she won the Turkish Super Cup, Teledünya Turkish Cup, Turkish Women's Volleyball League and became runner-up at 2009–10 CEV Women's Champions League.

See also
 Turkish women in sports

References

External links
 Player profile at fenerbahce.org

1990 births
Living people
Sportspeople from Ankara
Turkish women's volleyball players
Fenerbahçe volleyballers
VakıfBank S.K. volleyballers
Yeşilyurt volleyballers
Bahçeşehir University alumni